Skipper Island is one of the Rønnbeck Islands in the Svalbard archipelago. It lies northeast of Cape Weyprecht on Spitsbergen. The wildlife consists largely of polar bears.

The Rønnbeck Islands are named after Norwegian seal hunters, and this one is named after skippers in general.

References

Islands of Svalbard
Seal hunting